William Leggett may refer to:

 William Leggett (writer) (1801–1839), American poet, fiction writer, and journalist 
 William C. Leggett (born 1939), Canadian fish ecologist and oceanographer, former Principal of Queen's University
 William Henry Leggett (1816–1882), American botanist and journalist
 William J. Leggett (1848–1925), college football player, team captain of Rutgers in the first ever game